The Brookville BL20GH is a diesel-electric locomotive built by the Brookville Equipment Corporation. The locomotive is designed for both freight and passenger service. Brookville built 12 in 2008 for the Metro-North Railroad. The Staten Island Railway operates four nearly identical BL20G locomotives, built by Brookville in December 2008, in work service.

Design
It has a separate Caterpillar engine for head end power, allowing the locomotive to be used in passenger service for branch line shuttle trains. The Metro-North locomotives are equipped with Automatic train control (ATC).

History
Brookville built a single demonstrator for the Connecticut Department of Transportation (CDOT); CDOT and the Metro-North combined to order eleven more in 2008, for a total of twelve locomotives. CDOT owns six of the locomotives, which it painted in its "McGinnis" paint scheme, named after former New York, New Haven and Hartford Railroad president Patrick B. McGinnis. This scheme consists of a black nose, with a white stripe and an orange rear, with white New-Haven lettering overlapping the orange rear. The first public run occurred on June 9, 2008.

These locomotives are used in branch service on the Metro-North Railroad, including the Danbury Branch and Waterbury Branch. They are used on shuttle trains operating on routes where there is no third rail (such as the Upper Harlem Line, between Southeast and Wassaic stations.) They lack third-rail shoes and thus rarely operate into Grand Central Terminal.

The BL20GH locomotives began a rebuild program by MotivePower in 2019. The rebuilt units will be equipped with Cummins QSK50 prime movers, which are compliant with Tier 3 of the Environmental Protection Agency's standards for locomotive emissions. Following rebuild, they will be reclassified as BL20GHM. All units owned by ConnDOT were repainted into a paint scheme similar to the ones used on its CT Rail services.

Variants
A nearly identical locomotive, known as the BL20G, operates on the Staten Island Railway. Four were built by Brookville Corporation in December 2008. These locomotives lack the head-end power generator and the associated ventilation grates of the BL20GH, and thus they are only used in work train service unless performing a rescue of their R44 EMU's.

References

External links 

 Description of the BL20GH

B-B locomotives
Diesel-electric locomotives of the United States
EPA Tier 2-compliant locomotives of the United States
Brookville locomotives
Passenger locomotives
Standard gauge locomotives of the United States
Railway locomotives introduced in 2008